The Office of the Provost at Indiana University Bloomington oversees the academic programs, research, and policies of 16 schools on the Indiana University Bloomington campus. Together, these units offer more than 550 individual degree programs and majors.

College of Arts and Sciences

Eskenazi School of Art, Architecture + Design

Lugar School of Global and International Studies

The Media School
Communication Science
Cinema and Media Studies
Journalism
Media Arts and Production

Departments
The College of Arts and Sciences is academically organized into 42 departments:
 Department of African American and African Diaspora Studies

 Department of Anthropology
 Department of Apparel Merchandising and Interior Design
 Department of Art History
 Department of Astronomy
 Department of Biology
 Department of Central Eurasian Studies
 Department of Chemistry
 Department of Classical Studies
 Department of Computer Science
 Department of Comparative Literature
 Department of Criminal Justice
 Department of Earth and Atmospheric Sciences
 Department of East Asian Languages and Cultures
 Department of Economics
 Department of English
 Department of Folklore and Ethnomusicology
 Department of French and Italian
 Department of Germanic Studies
 Department of Gender Studies
 Department of Geography
 Department of History
 Department of the History and Philosophy of Science
 Department of Linguistics
 Department of Mathematics
 Department of Near Eastern Languages and Cultures
 Department of Philosophy
 Department of Physics
 Department of Political Science
 Department of Psychological and Brain Sciences
 Department of Religious Studies
 Department of Slavic Languages and Literatures
 Department of Sociology
 Department of Spanish and Portuguese
 Department of Speech and Hearing Sciences
 Department of Theatre, Drama, and Contemporary Dance
 Henry Radford Hope School of Fine Arts (SoFA)
 Department of Studio Art

Research Institutes
 Center for Biological Research Collections
 Center for Genomics and Bioinformatics
 Center for the Integrative Study of Animal Behavior
 Center for Latin American and Caribbean Studies
 Center for the Study of Global Change
 College Arts & Humanities Institute
 Creole Institute
 (Linda and Jack) Gill Center for Biomolecular Science
 Indiana Geological Survey
 Indiana Molecular Biology Institute
 Institute for European Studies
 Medieval Studies Institute
 Poynter Center for the Study of Ethics and American Institutions
 Russian and East European Institute
 Workshop in Political Theory and Policy Analysis

Research Laboratories
 Cyclotron Facility
 Department of Language and Computer Laboratories

Publications
 American Historical Review
 Indiana Journal of Hispanic Literatures
 Indiana Review

Museums
 Sidney and Lois Eskenazi Museum of Art
 Mathers Museum of World Cultures
 Grunwald Gallery
 Wylie House Museum

Academic Residences
 Collins Living-Learning Center
 Global Village Living-Learning Center

Jacobs School of Music

Departments
The Jacobs School of Music is academically organized into 22 departments:
 Department of Ballet
 Department of Bands
 Department of Brass
 Department of Choral Conducting
 Department of Composition
 Department of Early Music
 Department of Guitar
 Department of Harp
 Department of Instrumental Conducting
 Department of Jazz Studies
 Department of Music Education
 Department of Music in General Studies
 Department of Music Theory
 Department of Musicology
 Department of Opera Studies
 Department of Organ
 Department of Percussion
 Department of Piano
 Department of Recording Arts
 Department of Strings
 Department of Voice
 Department of Woodwinds

Research Institutes
 Center for Electronic and Computer Music
 Center for the History of Music Theory and Literature
 Early Music Institute
 Latin American Music Center
 (William and Gayle) Cook Music Library

Kelley School of Business

Departments
The Kelley School of Business is academically organized into nine departments:
 Department of Accounting
 Department of Business Communication
 Department of Business Economics and Public Policy
 Department of Business Law
 Department of Finance
 Department of Information Systems
 Department of Management
 Department of Marketing
 Department of Operations and Decisions Technologies

Research Institutes
 Center for Brand Leadership
 Center for Econometric Model Research
 Center for Education & Research in Retailing
 Center for International Business Education & Research
 Center for Real Estate Studies
 Indiana Business Research Center
 Institute for Corporate Governance
 Institute for Global Sales Studies
 Institute for Urban Transportation
 Johnson Center for Entrepreneurship & Innovation
 Tobias Center for Leadership Excellence

School of Education

Departments
The School of Education is academically organized into five departments:
 Department of Counseling and Educational Psychology
 Department of Curriculum and Instruction
 Department of Educational Leadership and Policy Studies
 Department of Instructional Systems Technology
 Department of Language Education

School of Public Health-Bloomington
formerly the School of Health, Physical Education, and Recreation

Departments
The School of Public Health-Bloomington is academically organized into five departments:
 Department of Applied Health Science
 Department of Environmental Health
 Department of Epidemiology and Biostatistics 
 Department of Kinesiology
 Department of Recreation, Park, and Tourism Studies

Research and Professional Institutes, Centers, and Affiliated Programs 

Centers

 Bradford Woods Outdoor and Leadership Center
 Rural Center for AIDS/STD Prevention
 Center for Sexual Health Promotion
 Center for Sport Policy and Conduct
 Center for Student Leadership Development
 Counsilman Center for the Science of Swimming
 Indiana Prevention Resource Center
 National Center on Accessibility
 Wynn F. Updyke Center for Physical Activity

Institutes & Working Groups

 Eppley Institute for Parks and Public Lands
 Leisure Research Institute
 Tobacco Control and Wellness Research Working Group

Laboratories

 Adapted Physical Education Lab
 Applied Health Behavior Research Laboratory
 Biomechanics Lab
 Human Performance Lab
 Industrial Hygiene Laboratory
 Nutrition Science Laboratories
 Oxidative  Stress Environmental Analysis Core Laboratory
 Underwater Science Lab

Affiliated Programs

 Academic Diving Program
 Dance Studio
 Dick Enberg Distance Learning Studio
 Executive Development Program
 Great Lakes Park Training Institute
 Counsilman Center Indiana Swim Team (CCiST)
 Institute for Outdoor Leadership and Education
 Outdoor Pool
 The President's Challenge
 Royer Pool
 Sports Medicine Facilities
 Tennis Center
 Tourism Research and Education Consortium (TREC)

School of Informatics and Computing

Departments

The School of Informatics and Computing is academically organized into two departments:
 Department of Computer Science
 Department of Informatics

School of Journalism

Research Institutes
 Center for Constitutional Democracy in Plural Societies
 Center for Law, Society, and Culture
 Center for Applied Cybersecurity Research

Division of Labor Studies

Maurer School of Law

Clinics
 Community Legal Clinic
 Conservation Law Clinic
 Disability Law Clinic
 Elder Law Clinic
 Elmore Entrepreneurship Law Clinic
 Viola J. Taliaferro Family and Children Mediation Clinic
 Federal Courts Clinic
 Nonprofit Legal Clinic

Research Institutes
 Center on the Global Legal Profession
 Center for Constitutional Democracy
 Center for Law, Society, and Culture
 Center for Applied Cybersecurity Research

School of Library and Information Science

Degrees
 Master of Information Science (MIS)
 Master of Library Science (MLS)
 Dual Degrees, Specializations, and Certificates
 Doctor of Philosophy in Information Science (PhD)

SLIS-related Research Groups
 Center for Research on Mediated Interaction (CROMI)
 Cyberinfrastructure for Network Science (CNS) Center
 Digital Library Program (DLP) - Indiana University
 Rob Kling Center for Social Informatics (RKCSI)
 Semantic Web Lab (SWL)

School of Optometry

Degrees 
 Doctor of Optometry (OD)
 Master of Science in Vision Science (MS)
 Doctor of Philosophy in Vision Science (PhD)
 Master of Business Administration (MBA) in Business of Eye Care in conjunction with the Kelley School of Business

O'Neill School of Public and Environmental Affairs
The O'Neill School of Public and Environmental Affairs is academically organized into two departments:
 Department of Public Affairs
 Department of Environmental Science

School of Social Work

University Graduate School

School: Office of the Vice Provost of Research (OVPR)
 Kinsey Institute for Research in Sex, Gender and Reproduction

References 

Indiana University Bloomington